Luis Arana may refer to :

 Luis Arana (1862–1951), Basque nationalist politician
 Luis Arana (sailor) (1876–1951), Spanish sailor